Adelfo Magallanes Campos (29 August 1910 – 16 January 1988) was a Peruvian footballer. He was part of the first golden era of the Peru national football team.

Playing career

Club
Born in Cañete, Magallanes developed his footballing skills as part of Alianza Lima, and became an important part of the famed Rodillo Negro era of the club. Nicknamed El Bólido, he played in the interior right and became the replacement of Alberto Montellanos in the Rodillo Negro.

International
His skill did not go unnoticed, and was soon called up to participate in the 1936 Summer Olympics held in Berlin. He earned a total of 22 caps, scoring 4 goals.

Managerial career
After retiring from playing, he became Alianza Lima's coach in two periods (1946–52 and 1954–56), and in-between those periods he went to manage in Colombia. He is the coach with which Alianza Lima has won the most titles (four: 1948, 1952, 1954, and 1955). Adelfo Magallanes died in 1988 at the age of 77.

Temporadas en Alianza Lima: 1930-44 (77 partidos, 16 goles). Títulos: Tres en Primera (1931,32,33) y uno en segunda división (1939).

Notes

References

External links
 
 

1910 births
1988 deaths
People from Lima Region
Peruvian footballers
Peru international footballers
Footballers at the 1936 Summer Olympics
Olympic footballers of Peru
Association football forwards
Peruvian Primera División players
Club Alianza Lima footballers
Club Alianza Lima managers
Deportivo Cali managers
América de Cali managers
Copa América-winning players
Peruvian football managers
Peruvian expatriate football managers
Expatriate football managers in Colombia
Peruvian expatriate sportspeople in Colombia